Sheikh Ali Sabah Al-Salem Al-Sabah (1948 – 13 April 1997) was a senior member of the House of Al-Sabah of Kuwait.

Biography 
Ali Al Sabah was the 2nd son of the 12th Ruler and 2nd Emir of Kuwait. He graduated from the RMA Sandhurst in 1970. In 1986 he was appointed governor of Ahmadi Governorate. On April 20, 1991, he was appointed Minister of Defense, and on October 17, 1992, after holding elections for the National Assembly, he was reappointed Minister of Defense. On April 13, 1994, with a cabinet reshuffle, he was appointed Minister of Interior. On September 3, 1996, he was appointed Minister of Social Affairs and Labor, in addition to his work as Minister of the Interior.

References 

1948 births
1997 deaths